Mattenalpsee (or Lake Mattenalp) is a reservoir in the municipality of Innertkirchen, Canton of Berne, Switzerland. The reservoir receives the water from Gauli Glacier. The water is channeled into Räterichsbodensee.

See also
List of mountain lakes of Switzerland

External links
Lake Mattenalp

Bernese Oberland
Oberhasli
Reservoirs in Switzerland
Lakes of the canton of Bern
RMattenalpsee